Mimene atropatene, the purple swift, is a butterfly of the  family Hesperiidae. It is found along the north-eastern coast of Queensland, as well as on the Aru Islands, Irian Jaya and Papua New Guinea.

The wingspan is about 40 mm.

External links
Australian Insects: Mimene atropatene
Australian Faunal Directory: Mimene atropatene

Hesperiinae
Butterflies of Asia
Butterflies of Australia
Butterflies of Indonesia
Lepidoptera of New Guinea
Lepidoptera of Papua New Guinea
Fauna of the Aru Islands
Insects of Queensland
Insects of Southeast Asia
Insects of Western New Guinea
Butterflies described in 1911